XHSAB-FM (89.5 FM) is a radio station in Sabinas Hidalgo, Nuevo León, known as Vive FM. XHSAB is part of the Nuevo León state-owned Radio Nuevo León public network.

XHSAB is relayed on 97.7 FM in Bustamante, Nuevo León. This station was licensed in 2003 with the callsign XHBUS, but its permit expired in 2010, even though said station is still operating. There is a 97.7 FM in Sabinas Hidalgo, XHESH-FM, that is unrelated to the state government.

References

Radio stations in Nuevo León